Moravčík (feminine Moravčíková) is a Slovak surname, it may refer to:
 Anton Moravčík, Slovak footballer
 Filip Moravčík, Slovak footballer
 Jozef Moravčík, Slovak diplomat
 Ľubomír Moravčík, Slovak footballer
 Martina Moravčíková, Czech swimmer
 Michal Moravčík, Czech ice hockey player
 Soňa Moravčíková, Slovak alpine skier
 Zuzana Moravčíková, Slovak ice hockey player
 Zuzana Moravčíková, Slovak track athlete

See also 
 Moravec (surname)
 Morávek
 Moravek
 Moravetz
 Morawetz
 Morawitz

Slovak-language surnames